Thomas Stewart (11 March 1926 – 7 May 1989) was a Scottish amateur footballer who played as a right half in the Scottish League for Queen's Park and in English non-League football for Bishop Auckland and Romford. He captained Scotland at amateur level and represented Great Britain at the 1952 Summer Olympics.

Personal life 
Stewart worked in advertising.

Career statistics

Honours 
Bishop Auckland
 FA Amateur Cup (2): 1954–55, 1955–56

References 

1926 births
1989 deaths
Scottish footballers
Scottish Football League players
Queen's Park F.C. players
Association football fullbacks
Scotland amateur international footballers
Romford F.C. players
Bishop Auckland F.C. players
Olympic footballers of Great Britain
Footballers at the 1952 Summer Olympics
Northern Football League players
Isthmian League players
Association football wing halves
Footballers from Renfrewshire